Tomer Yosefi (born 2 February 1999) is an Israeli footballer who plays as a midfielder for Hapoel Haifa.

Early life
Yosefi was born and raised in the affluent town of Lehavim, Israel, to an Israeli family of Jewish descent.

Career
Yosefi grew up in the youth division of Hapoel Be'er Sheva. On 12 January 2019, the 2018–19 season, he made his first appearance in an adult game in Hapoel Beer Sheva in a 2–0 loss to Maccabi Haifa in the Premier League. On 19 May 2019 Yosefi scored his first goal in a 0–1 win over Hapoel Hadera in the Premier League.

Career statistics

Honours

Club 
Hapoel Be'er Sheva
State Cup: 2019–20, 2021–22
Super Cup: 2022

See also 

 List of Jewish footballers
 List of Jews in sports
 List of Israelis

References

External links
Tomer Yosefi at Israel Football Association
Tomer Yosefi at Scores24

1999 births
Living people
Israeli Jews
Jewish footballers
Israeli footballers
Hapoel Be'er Sheva F.C. players
Hapoel Haifa F.C. players
Israeli Premier League players
Footballers from Southern District (Israel)
Israel under-21 international footballers
Association football wingers
Association football forwards